Princess is Taiwanese Mandopop artist Jam Hsiao's second Mandarin studio album. It was released on 17 July 2009 by Warner Music Taiwan. The album was available for pre-order, from 23 June 2009, as the Princess (First Press Limited Edition) (王妃 全球首日封榮耀限定款) which includes gifts and photobook. A further edition, Princess (Live Limited Edition) (王妃 Live 影音限定版 2CD+DVD) was released on 28 August 2009 with bonus CD and DVD containing live tracks and footage from Hsiao's Princess Live Concert Tour at Tainan, Taiwan.

The track "Say a lil something" is composed by label mate Khalil Fong and four tracks, "小男人大男孩" (Not A Boy, Not Yet A Man), "Green Door", "給愛人" (To My Beloved) and "寂寞還是你" (Lonesome for You) are composed by Hsiao. The music video for "我不會愛" (Don't Know How to Love) features Taiwanese actress Sandrine Pinna.

Reception
The album debuted at number one on Taiwan's G-Music Top 20 Weekly Mandarin and Combo Charts at week 29, and Five Music Chart at week 30 with a percentage sales of 33.1%, 22.76% and 24.45% respectively.

The tracks "王妃" (Princess), "我不會愛" (Don't Know How to Love) and "阿飛的小蝴蝶" (A-Fei's Little Butterfly) are listed at number 2, 4 and 9 respectively on Hit Fm Taiwan's Hit Fm Annual Top 100 Singles Chart (Hit-Fm年度百首單曲) for 2009.

The track, "Say a lil something" won one of the Songs of the Year at the 2010 Metro Radio Mandarin Music Awards presented by Hong Kong radio station Metro Info. According to Taiwan's G-Music chart the album is the eighth best selling album in Taiwan in 2009.

Track listing
NB. Title - Songwriter/ Composer/ Producer
 "王妃" (Princess) - 陳鎮川 / Lee Shih Shiong / Lee Shih Shiong - 3’39”
 "我不會愛" (Don't Know How to Love) - 鄔裕康/ Kim, Seok Jin / 李偉菘 -  4’05”
 "阿飛的小蝴蝶" (A-Fei's Little Butterfly) - Adia (阿弟仔)/ Adia (阿弟仔)/ Adia (阿弟仔) - 4’13”
 "善男信女" (Believers) - 陳鎮川/ Lee Wei Song/ Lee Wei Song - 4’28”
 "Say a lil something" - 崔惟楷 / Khalil Fong / Lee Shih Shiong - 3’28”
 "愛遊戲" (Love Games) - 陳鎮川 / 陳偉 / 陳偉 - 3’48”
 "小男人大男孩" (Not A Boy, Not Yet A Man) - Jam Hsiao/ Jam Hsiao/ Jam Hsiao - 3’32”
 "會痛的石頭" (Stone That Knows Pain) - Yáo Ruòlóng / Jeong Si Ro, Kang Eun Kyung/ Lee Shih Shiong - 4’46”
 "愛過了頭" (Loving You Too Deeply) - 胡如虹/ Lee Wei Song/ Lee Wei Song - 4’24”
 "Green Door" - Jam Hsiao/ Jam Hsiao/ Jam Hsiao -  3’15”

Bonus tracks
 "給愛人" (To My Beloved) - 陳鎮川/ Jam Hsiao/ 鍾興民 黃韻玲 -  3’44”
 "寂寞還是你" (Lonesome for You) - Jam Hsiao/ Jam Hsiao/ 馬奕強 - 3’39”

Releases
Three editions were released by Warner Music Taiwan:
 23 June 2009 - Pre-order Princess (First Press Limited Edition) (王妃 全球首日封榮耀限定款) - includes gifts and photobook.
 17 July 2009 - Princess (王妃)
 28 August 2009 - Princess (Live Limited Edition) (王妃 Live 影音限定版 2CD+DVD) - includes a bonus CD containing 10 live tracks and a DVD containing live footage of the same 10 tracks recorded at Hsiao's Princess Live Concert Tour at Tainan, Taiwan.
Live CD/DVD 
 "王妃" (Princess)
 "善男信女" (Believers)
 "愛過了頭" (Loving You Too Deeply)
 "小男人大男孩" (Not A Boy, Not Yet A Man)
 "Green Door"
 "Say a lil something"
 "我不會愛" (Don't Know How to Love)
 "阿飛的小蝴蝶" (A-Fei's Little Butterfly)
 "寂寞還是你" (Lonesome for You) 
 "會痛的石頭" (Stone That Knows Pain)

Charts

References

External links
  Jam Hsiao@Warner Music Taiwan

2009 albums
Jam Hsiao albums
Warner Music Taiwan albums